Mignonette sauce is a condiment made with minced shallots, cracked pepper, and vinegar traditionally served with raw oysters. 

The French term mignonnette originally referred to a sachet of peppercorns, cloves, and spices used to flavor liquids, but now means cracked pepper. 

While mignonette sauces may differ based on the type of vinegar, all contain pepper and shallots.

See also
 List of condiments
 List of sauces

External links
 Mignonette Sauce, Martha Stewart
 Mignonette Recipe, The Bon Appétit Test Kitchen
 Mignonette Sauce, Epicurious

References

Sauces
Vinegar